Chilabothrus striatus, the Hispaniolan boa, is a species of snake in the family Boidae. The species is endemic to Hispaniola (split between Haiti and the Dominican Republic). The species is regularly found in the international pet trade.

Subspecies

Three subspecies are recognized:

Chilabothrus striatus exagistus  – Tiburon Peninsula boa
Chilabothrus striatus striatus  – Hispaniolan or Dominican red mountain boa
Chilabothrus striatus warreni  – Tortuga Island boa

Nota bene: A trinomial authority in parentheses indicates that the subspecies was originally described in a genus other than Chilabothrus.

Etymology
The subspecific name warreni is in honor of C. Rhea Warren who collected herpetological specimens on Île de la Tortue.

References

Further reading
Boulenger GA (1893). Catalogue of the Snakes in the British Museum (Natural History). Volume I., Containing the Families ... Boidæ ... London: Trustees of the British Museum (Natural History). (Taylor and Francis, printers). xiii + 448 pp. + Plates I-XXVIII. (Epicrates striatus, pp. 96–97).
Fischer JG (1856). "Neue Schlangen des Hamburgischen Naturhistorischen Museums ". Abhandlungen aus dem Gebiete der Naturwissenschaften Verein in Hamburg 3 (4): 79–116. (Homalochilus striatus, new species, pp. 102–106 + Plate II, Figures 2a & 2b). (in German).
Sheplan BR, Schwartz A (1974). "Hispaniolan Boas of the genus Epicrates (Serpentes, Boidae) and their Antillean relationships". Annals of Carnegie Museum of Natural History 45: 57–143.

striatus
Taxa named by Johann Gustav Fischer
Reptiles of the Dominican Republic
Reptiles of Haiti
Endemic fauna of Hispaniola
Reptiles described in 1856
Species endangered by the pet trade